"Big City" is the fifth and last single from the English alternative rock band Spacemen 3. It entered the UK charts at position #88. It was released in January 1991, shortly after the band split up, as a 7", 12" and CD single. The 7" contains a shorter version of the song than the 12". A remixed version was released separately. The 7" edit appears on the band's final album Recurring under the title "Big City (Everyone I Know Can Be Found Here)".

The track featured in the Simpsons episode Every Man's Dream, as the soundtrack to a psychedelic drug trip montage. It was used with songwriter Peter Kember's approval.

Track listing
7" (BLAZE 41S)

12" (BLAZE 41T)

CDS (BLAZE 41CD)

Remix 12" (BLAZE 41TR)

Personnel

Spacemen 3
Sonic Boom – vocals, guitar, keyboards, producer
Jason – guitar, vocals, organ, producer
Will Carruthers - bass
Jon Mattock – drums

Additional personnel
Paul Adkins - engineer

References

1991 singles
1991 songs
Fire Records (UK) singles